Walking Miracle is the eleventh overall album by gospel singer Vanessa Bell Armstrong, and her first for EMI Gospel.

Leading up to its release, Miracle was heavily touted as a comeback effort citing Armstrong's recent family and health challenges that forced her to take a 6-year hiatus from recording. During the recent years since leaving her recording contract with Jive/Verity, her marriage dissolved and she suffered a stroke. The title track as well, produced by Jerkins, was written for and dedicated to Armstrong's son who was suffering from multiple sclerosis during the recording of the album.

The genre makeup of the album is evenly divided between traditional gospel styled ballads courtesy of Cedric Caldwell and Grammy-winner Smokie Norful, and ultra modern R&B beats courtesy of super-producers Rodney Jerkins and Fred Jerkins III. The album was led by the single release of "So Good To Me," written by Smokie Norful.

To promote the album, Armstrong appeared in series of performances of Gospel On Broadway in November 2007. She also joined a McDonald's-sponsored gospel tour with Kierra "Kiki" Sheard and Smokie Norful.

Prior to this full-length release, Armstrong made a high-profile appearance as a guest on Donald Lawrence & The Tri-City Singers' Finale album. Armstrong also joined Kelly Price on a remake of the former's own classic gospel hit "Nobody But Jesus" on Price's debut gospel release This Is Who I Am.

Track listing 
 Walking Miracle (3:44)
 Seasons (3:37)
 So Good To Me (4:27)
 Wait (4:54)
 Fall In Love Again (3:57)
 Watch Me (4:30)
 Til The Victory's Won (3:51)
 Just Hold On (4:35)
 It's Over Now (4:06)
 I Just Love You (3:58)

References

External links 
 

Vanessa Bell Armstrong albums
2007 albums